Vojislav Bralušić (born 10 September 1980) is a Serbian football manager who is currently head coach of FC Ulaanbaatar.

References

External links
 

Living people
Serbian football managers
Serbian expatriate football managers
Expatriate football managers in Mongolia
FK Rad managers
Mongolia national football team managers
1980 births